Steffen Wiesinger (born 27 November 1969) is a German fencer. He competed in the sabre events at the 1992 and 1996 Summer Olympics.

References

External links
 

1969 births
Living people
German male fencers
Olympic fencers of Germany
Fencers at the 1992 Summer Olympics
Fencers at the 1996 Summer Olympics
Universiade medalists in fencing
Sportspeople from Stuttgart (region)
Universiade bronze medalists for Germany
Medalists at the 1995 Summer Universiade
People from Lauda-Königshofen